Cape Oakeley is a bold headland on the northeast side of Quam Heights. It forms the south side of the entrance of Smith Inlet in northern Victoria Land. Discovered in 1841 by Captain James Ross, Royal Navy, who named it for Henry Oakeley, mate on the Erebus.

Headlands of Victoria Land
Pennell Coast